Stephen Bannister (born 18 October 1987), also known by the nickname of "Ste", is an English rugby league footballer who has played in the 2000s and 2010s.

Background
Stephen Bannister was born in Billinge, Merseyside, England, he was a pupil at Newton-le-Willows Community High School, leaving in 2005.

Playing career
During November 2006, Bannister was promoted to train with St. Helens' first-team squad, making his début on 19 August 2006 against the Catalans Dragons.  He later played several games for Whitehaven on loan in 2007.

Bannister signed for London club Harlequins RL following the completion of his loan with the Cumbrian National League One side in June 2007.

Bannister is a  who has been compared to Great Britain's international Lee Gilmour.

References

External links
 Profile at saints.org.uk
 (archived by web.archive.org) Welcome Bannister
 St Helens bolstered by Hargreaves
 Saints Invest in Local Youth
Statistics at rugby.widnes.tv

1987 births
Living people
English rugby league players
Halifax R.L.F.C. players
Hemel Stags players
London Broncos players
London Skolars players
North Wales Crusaders players
Rochdale Hornets players
Rugby league players from Billinge, Merseyside
Rugby league second-rows
Sporting Olympique Avignon players
St Helens R.F.C. players
Whitehaven R.L.F.C. players
Widnes Vikings players